Jerry L. Greenberg is an American music executive, who at 32, was the youngest president of any major record company in the recording industry and received that title in 1974 as President of Atlantic Records.

He started his career in the music business as a drummer in the band "Jerry Green and The Passengers" which he founded. The band recorded for Atlantic Records, Roulette Records, United Artists, and DCP Record labels. By the age of eighteen years, Greenberg already had his own record label, called Green-Sea Records.

During his tenure as president of several major labels, Jerry has signed such acts as ABBA, The Blues Brothers, Foreigner, Genesis, TS Monk, Whitesnake, Chic, Nile Rodgers, Dr. Dre & Eazy-E (Production Deal), Motörhead, Brownstone and 3T. Jerry also introduced Mariah Carey to Tommy Mottola.

In addition to signing acts Jerry has worked with some of the greatest artists in music including, AC/DC, Aretha Franklin, Bad Company, Bee Gees, Crosby Stills Nash & Young, Dr. John, Dusty Springfield, Eagles, Emerson, Lake & Palmer, Eric Clapton, Led Zeppelin, The Rolling Stones, Yes, and Michael Jackson.

Biography

Jerry Green and The Passengers
1957 - Gerald L. Greenberg from New Haven, CT formed his own band. The band recorded for Atlantic Records, Roulette Records, United Artists, and DCP Records as Jerry Green and The Passengers. By the age of eighteen, Greenberg already had his own record label, called Green-Sea Records.

Seaboard Distributors
1964 - Greenberg joined Seaboard Distributors in Hartford, CT, as a record promoter, where he promoted records to radio stations for such labels as Atlantic Records, Chess Records, Liberty Records, Mercury Records, Phillips, Roulette Records, and many others.

Gerald Wexler
1967 - Jerry Wexler asked Greenberg to become his personal assistant at Atlantic Records. At that time, Wexler was Vice President of Atlantic Records, and was the producer of Aretha Franklin, Dusty Springfield, Dr. John, and many others. Wexler taught Greenberg all about recording, producing, finding songs, and the day-to-day tasks of running a major label.

General Manager of Atlantic Records
1969 - When Atlantic's parent company, Warner Bros-Seven Arts was sold to Kinney Services (Predecessor to Warner Communications in 1969, Greenberg was announced General Manager of Atlantic Records. Jerry Wexler spent a majority of his time in Florida, which left Greenberg plenty of time to spend with Ahmet Ertegun, who was President of Atlantic at that time.

Vice President of Radio Promotion and Artists and Repertoire
1972 - Within five years, Greenberg held two titles; Vice President of Radio Promotion, and Vice President of Artists and Repertoire for Atlantic Records.

Ahmet Ertegun announces new President
1974 -  Ahmet Ertegun, now Chairman, announced Greenberg as President of Atlantic Records, making him the youngest president of a major record company at 32. Greenberg was then signing artists and overseeing the company on a daily basis.

Mirage is Born
1980 - Jerry Greenberg becomes a consultant to Atlantic while forming his own label with his brother, Bob Greenberg, called Mirage Music; Jerry remained on the East Coast, Bob on the West Coast.

MGM/United Artists Music
1986 - Greenberg is named President of MGM/United Artists. During his tenure at United Artists Music, he was executive producer for the soundtrack to the movie 'Karate Kid 2,' which went gold. With Chairman Jerry Weintraub leaving the company abruptly, the new management team didn't want to continue having a recording company. Greenberg was asked to stay on and produce movie soundtracks, and in turn, ended up working with such greats as Mel Brooks on the soundtrack for the 1987 comedy, 'Spaceballs.'

Atco Records
1988 - Greenberg was asked to return to Atlantic Records as President of Atco Records, which was Atlantic's other label based in California. Once there, he continued to sign major artists, including Michel'le and JJ Fad, produced by Dr. Dre and Eazy-E. Both albums went platinum, and it was the first rap album to go platinum for WEA Distribution. He also signed a platinum rock group from England, The Escape Club, and served as executive producer of the soundtrack to the hit motion picture, Coming to America, starring Eddie Murphy.

WTG (Walter (Yetnikoff), Tommy (Motolla), Gerald (Greenberg) Records
1989 - Tommy Mottola, who took over Sony Music, offered Greenberg a label in California. Gerald was the third person Mottola hired on his team and let him form his own label as President of WTG Records.

MJJ Music (Michael Jackson)
1993 - Sony artist Michael Jackson offered Greenberg the position of President of MJJ Music, Jackson's label distributed through Sony. Greenberg served as President and CEO of MJJ Music from 1993 to 2000.

Westwood One
1994 - Greenberg is elected to the Board of Directors of Westwood One, the world's #1 supplier of talk, sports, radio, news, and shows all over the world. He currently sits on this Board as the Chairman of the Compensation Committee.

Mirage Music is reactivated
2003-04 - Mirage Music Entertainment has been reactivated with a distribution deal through Sony Music. In addition, Mirage opened a subsidiary office in Jamaica with Stacy Greenberg as General Manager and an office in Las Vegas, NV.

Rainbow Bar & Grill Expansion Group
2005 - Jerry & Bob Greenberg form the Rainbow Bar & Grill Expansion Group. They licensed the name from America's No. 1 Rock & Roll Restaurant on Sunset Strip in Hollywood. The first restaurant opened in June 2005 in Las Vegas, across from the Hard Rock Hotel.

The Rainbow Bar & Grill in Las Vegas recreates the Hollywood location with red leather booths and rock-n-roll memorabilia adorning the walls.

MusiCares
2007 - Jerry Greenberg joins the board of MusiCares established in 1989 by The Recording Academy. MusiCares provides a safety net of critical assistance for music people in times of need. MusiCares services and resources cover a wide range of financial, medical and personal emergencies and each case is treated with integrity and confidentially.

Mirage Music Entertainment
2009 to 2011 - Mirage Tribute Bands is formed. MTB handled tribute bands Led Zepagain (Led Zeppelin tribute band), Rolling the Stones (The Rolling Stones tribute band), ABBACADABRA (ABBA tribute band), Bonfire (AC/DC tribute band), Bella Donna (Stevie Nicks tribute band), The Long Run (Eagles tribute band), Fan Halen (Van Halen tribute band) and others. MTB presented Bring Back the Music every Wednesday night at the Hilton Hotel (now Westgate) in Las Vegas.

PEM Records
2013 to Present - Greenberg forms new EDM label with partners from Ibiza, Spain. "With the new EDM music scene emerging, a new music label from Ibiza and LA is a perfect fit," said Greenberg.

Greenberg also has one granddaughter, Eden

Artists signed by Jerry Greenberg

Atlantic Records
 J. Geils Band
ABBA
Archie Bell and the Drells
Blue Magic
The Blues Brothers
Cerrone
Chic
Firefall
Foreigner
Gary Numan
Genesis
Major Harris
Roxy Music
Trammps

 Jackie Moore
 Yusef Lateef

Mirage Music
Brenda K Starr
Gerard McMann
Nile Rodgers
Nolan Thomas
Phoebe Snow
Robin Gibb
Shannon
South Side Johnny
TS Monk
Whitesnake

 Spinners

Xavion

Atco Records
Dr. Dre & Eazy-E (Production Deal)
Escape Club
Michel'le
JJ Fad

 R.B. Greaves
 Acker Bilk

WTG/Sony Records
Pauly Shore
Eddie Griffin
Johnny Crash
Jimmy Harnen
Michael Rodgers
8th Wonder
Jason Bonham Band
Louie Louie
Motörhead
Stephanie

M.J.J./Sony Music
3T
Brownstone
Quo
Rebbie Jackson
Tatyana Ali
Nathan Cavaleri
Men Of Vizion
Tasha Scott

References
Rainbow Bar & Grill Press Mention
Look Smart Article

External links
 
 Rainbow Bar and Grill LV
Jerry Greenberg Interview NAMM Oral History Library (2021)

American music industry executives
Year of birth missing (living people)
Living people